Eudorylas montium is a species of fly in the family Pipunculidae.

Distribution
Austria, Belgium, Great Britain, Czech Republic, Denmark, Germany, Hungary, Italy, Latvia, Norway, Poland, Slovakia, Spain, Switzerland, Netherlands.

References

Pipunculidae
Insects described in 1897
Diptera of Europe
Taxa named by Theodor Becker